This article deals with the pharmaceutical uses of human fat. For a general view, see Adipose tissue.

Human fat (German Menschenfett, Latin Axungia hominis) was mentioned in European pharmacopoeias since the 16th century as an important fatty component of quality deemed ointments and other pharmaceuticals in Europe. In old recipes human adipose tissue was mentioned as Pinguedo hominis, or Axungia hominis (abbrev. Axung. hominis), besides other animal fats from bears (Axung. ursi), vipers (Axung. viperarum), beavers (Axung. castoris), cats (Axung. Cati sylvestris) and many others. The German medicinal Johann Agricola (1496–1570) described the recovery of human fat and its applications.

In traditional medicine in Europe, human fat was believed to have a healing magic significance until the 19th century. Many executioners recovered the fat from the bodies of their executants, called "Armsünderfett" or "Armsünderschmalz" (German for fat or grease from poor sinners put to death), and sold it. For some executioners the marketing of human fat was a major source of revenue. In traditional medicine many other parts of executed bodies as well as their fat were awarded a special action force, which evolved from a pagan sacrificial belief. The human fat was used to make ointments for treatment of various diseases such as bone pain, toothache and gout. It was also regarded as a panacea for particular diseases associated with cachexia (e.g. tuberculosis). Also an analgesic effect in rheumatoid arthritis was given to human fat.

From the late 19th century, human fat was produced and offered under the trade name Humanol as a sterile, liquified preparation for injections in Germany. In 1909 it was introduced for surgical treatment of scars, wound disinfection, and wound revisions. In the 1920s it became out of fashion after low cure rates and the incidence of fat embolisms caused by its application.

Until the 1960s various manufacturers offered alleged wrinkle creams for external use (Hormocenta of Hormocenta Cosmetic Böttger GmbH, or Placentubex C of Merz Pharmaceuticals) containing human fat from placentas collected from midwives and obstetric departments for industrial purposes. The use of human placentas was terminated in favour of animal products. In Peru a group of gangsters called pishtacos was accused of having manufactured and marketed human fat; the case turned out as a free invention of the investigators.

Myths

Both Spanish (sacamantecas) and Peruvian (pishtaco) folklore contain examples of monsters or criminals who murder human victims for their fat.
Manuel Blanco Romasanta (1809–1863), the first serial killer documented in Spain, was accused of extracting fat from his victims to sell in Portugal, exchanging an ounce of fat for an ounce of gold.

This folk belief survives to the modern day. In Latin American urban legends, it is claimed that human fat is used to grease bells for better sound, or applied to modern machinery such as railways or airplanes.

See also

References 

History of pharmacy
Connective tissue
Endocrine system
Human anatomy
Animal fat products